Rishikesh Das (born 6 December 1991) is an Indian cricketer. He made his Twenty20 debut for Odisha in the 2015–16 Syed Mushtaq Ali Trophy on 4 January 2016.

References

External links
 

1991 births
Living people
Indian cricketers
Odisha cricketers
Cricketers from Odisha